Hermann Grapow (1 September 1885 in Rostock – 24 August 1967 in Berlin) was a German Egyptologist.

Works
Wörterbuch der ägyptischen Sprache, 7 Bände, Berlin, 1925 ff.
Anatomie und Physiologie, Berlin, 1954
Kranker, Krankheiten und Arzt : Vom gesunden u. kranken Ägypter, von d. Krankheiten, vom Arzt u. von d. ärztl. Tätigkeit, Berlin 1956
Die medizinischen Texte in hieroglyphischer Umschreibung autographiert, Berlin, 1958
Wörterbuch der ägyptischen Drogennamen, Berlin 1959 (gemeinsam mit H. v. Deines)
Wie die alten Ägypter sich anredeten, wie sie sich grüssten und wie sie miteinander sprachen, Berlin 1960

References

1885 births
1967 deaths
German Egyptologists
German male non-fiction writers
Members of the German Academy of Sciences at Berlin
People from Rostock
Archaeologists from Mecklenburg-Western Pomerania
20th-century archaeologists
20th-century German male writers
20th-century German non-fiction writers